Theodore Richards (born 1818, date of death unknown) was a convict transported to Western Australia, who later became one of the colony's ex-convict school teachers.

Born in 1818, Richards had a wife and one child and was working as a clerk and commercial traveller in 1858, when he was convicted of embezzlement and sentenced to ten years' penal servitude.  He was transported to Western Australia on board the Palmerston, arriving in February 1861.  After receiving his ticket of leave, he taught at the Katrine school from 1864 until 1875, then the Wicklow Hills school until 1885.  During his time at Katrine he employed another convict, Frederick Carter, as his servant and assistant teacher.

References
 

1818 births
Year of death missing
Convicts transported to Western Australia
Settlers of Western Australia
Australian schoolteachers